USEF may refer to:
 United States Equestrian Federation
 Institute for Unmanned Space Experiment Free Flyer of Japan